Ulukent is a railway station in Ulukent, Izmir Province, Turkey. The station is served by İZBAN's Northern Line and TCDD's Alsancak-Uşak Express. For the construction of the Karşıyaka Tunnel, all trains started and terminated at Ulukent between 2008 and 2010.

Railway stations in İzmir Province
Railway stations opened in 1865
1865 establishments in the Ottoman Empire
Menemen District